Joan Jordán Moreno (born 6 July 1994) is a Spanish professional footballer who plays for Sevilla as a central midfielder.

Club career

Espanyol
Born in Regencós, Girona, Catalonia, Jordán joined RCD Espanyol's youth system in 2011 at the age of 17, after a stint with lowly UD Poblense. He made his senior debut for the reserves in the 2012–13 season in Segunda División B, becoming a regular starter afterwards.

On 21 August 2014, Jordán signed a new five-year contract with the club, being definitely promoted to the first team. He made his competitive and La Liga debut nine days later, coming on as a substitute for Abraham in the 70th minute of a 1–2 home loss against Sevilla FC.

Jordán scored his first goal in the top flight on 10 January 2016, but in a 2–1 defeat at SD Eibar. On 26 July, he was loaned to Segunda División side Real Valladolid for one year.

Eibar
On 13 July 2017, Jordán joined Eibar on a three-year deal. In his first season, he contributed six goals and four assists to a final ninth place in the top tier.

Sevilla
Jordán signed with Sevilla on 27 June 2019, for a reported €14 million. He finished his first year at the Ramón Sánchez Pizjuán Stadium with 47 competitive games (including ten in their victorious run in the UEFA Europa League), totalling 50 in the 2020–21 campaign.

On 15 January 2022, while he and his teammates celebrated equalising at Real Betis in the round of 16 of the Copa del Rey, Jordán was hit in the head with what appeared to be a metal pole thrown from the stands; the match was abandoned and resumed the following day – without the player, resting at home after being released from hospital– and the home team won 2–1.

Career statistics

Club

Honours
Sevilla
UEFA Europa League: 2019–20

References

External links
Sevilla official profile

1994 births
Living people
People from Baix Empordà
Sportspeople from the Province of Girona
Spanish footballers
Footballers from Catalonia
Association football midfielders
La Liga players
Segunda División players
Segunda División B players
RCD Espanyol B footballers
RCD Espanyol footballers
Real Valladolid players
SD Eibar footballers
Sevilla FC players
UEFA Europa League winning players
Catalonia international footballers